Sir Denis William Brogan (11 August 1900 – 5 January 1974) was a Scottish writer and historian.

Early life and education 
Denis Brogan was born in Glasgow, the eldest son of Denis Brogan (1856–1934), a master tailor, and Elizabeth Toner. His father was originally from County Donegal, and was a liberal-minded pro-Boer and Irish nationalist who, at one point, served as head of the Glasgow branch of the United Irish League, while his mother was a sister of John Toner, Bishop of Dunkeld. The younger Brogan was educated at St Columcille's Roman Catholic School, Rutherglen, and Rutherglen Academy. Having initially been cajoled by his parents to study medicine at the University of Glasgow, he switched to an arts degree following a series of low marks in his examinations, graduating MA Hons. in 1923. Brogan subsequently studied at Balliol College, Oxford, where he obtained a further degree in history in 1925. He then spent an additional year studying American politics at Harvard University on a Rockefeller Research Fellowship.

Brogan had three brothers, of whom the best known was the conservative journalist Colm Brogan (1902–1977). His other two siblings, Willie and Diarmuid, both taught at St Mungo's Academy in the East End of Glasgow.

Career 
Upon returning from Harvard, Brogan was briefly a journalist at The Times of London. He then chose to enter academia, acquiring successive teaching posts at University College, London, and the London School of Economics. It was while at the latter institution that Brogan published his work The American Political System (1933), which was later described in The Guardian as "in many ways replac[ing] the classic work of Lord Bryce on American politics." According to Herbert Butterfield, the left-wing economist Harold Laski endowed Brogan with the "both the stimulus and the patronage" necessary to write the book.

In 1934, Brogan was elected a fellow of Corpus Christi College, Oxford. Five years later, in 1939, he moved to the University of Cambridge to take up the chair in political science, becoming a fellow of Peterhouse; he remained there until his retirement in 1968. He was elected to the American Academy of Arts and Sciences in 1966 and the American Philosophical Society in 1971. Brogan became known for broadcast radio talks, chiefly on historical themes, and as a panellist on BBC Radio's Round Britain Quiz, where he affected a testy, hyperacademic persona. In 1963, he was knighted.

Death 
Brogan died in Cambridge on 5 January 1974. He is buried in the Parish of the Ascension Burial Ground in Cambridge. His wife Olwen Phillis Francis (Lady Brogan), OBE, archaeologist and authority on Roman Libya and the mother of his four children – including the historian Hugh Brogan and journalist Patrick Brogan – is also buried in the same cemetery; she later became Olwen Hackett on her second marriage, when she married Charles Hackett.

Works 
 The American Political System (1933) Excerpts
 Proudhon (1934)
 The Development of modern France, 1870–1939 (1940 and later editions)
 Politics and Law in the United States (1941) Excerpts
 The English People: Impressions and Observations (1943)
 The American Character (1944)
 French Personalities and Problems (1945) Excerpts
 The Era of Franklin D. Roosevelt (1950)
 The Price of Revolution (1951)
 Politics in America (1954)
 The French Nation: from Napoleon to Pétain, 1814–1940 (1957)
 America in the Modern World (1960)
 American Aspects (1964)
 Worlds in Conflict (1967)
 France under the Republic (1974)

References

External links
 Sir Denis William Brogan, National Portrait Gallery
 
 Proudhon
 

1900 births
1974 deaths
Writers from Glasgow
20th-century Scottish historians
Alumni of Balliol College, Oxford
Fellows of Peterhouse, Cambridge
Historians of the United States
Harvard University alumni
People educated at Rutherglen Academy
Scottish people of Irish descent
Members of the American Philosophical Society